A general election was held in the U.S. state of Arizona on November 4, 2014. All of Arizona's executive officers were up for election as well as all of Arizona's nine seats in the United States House of Representatives. Primary elections were held on August 26, 2014.

U.S. House of Representatives

All of Arizona's nine seats in the United States House of Representatives were up for election in 2014.

Governor

Incumbent Republican Governor Jan Brewer was term-limited and could not run for re-election to a second full term in office. After a bitter six-candidate primary, Republicans nominated Arizona State Treasurer Doug Ducey; Democrat Fred DuVal, the former chairman of the Arizona Board of Regents, won his party's nomination unopposed.

Secretary of State

Incumbent Republican Secretary of State Ken Bennett was term-limited and ineligible to run for re-election to a third term in office. He instead ran unsuccessfully for the Republican nomination for governor. state senator Michele Reagan won the Republican primary, while former Attorney General Terry Goddard won the Democratic nomination unopposed.

Attorney General
Incumbent Republican Attorney General Tom Horne ran for re-election to a second term in office. Horne, who was under investigation for multiple violations of election laws, was considered vulnerable in both the primary and general elections. Various Arizona Republicans called for him to resign or endorsed his opponent.

Republican primary

Candidates
 Tom Horne, incumbent attorney general
 Mark Brnovich, director of the Arizona Department of Gaming

Polling

Results

Democratic primary

Candidates
 Felecia Rotellini, attorney and nominee for attorney general in 2010

Results

General election

Polling

Results

Brnovich:    
Rotellini:

Treasurer
Incumbent Republican State Treasurer Doug Ducey did not run for re-election to a second term in office. He successfully sought the Republican nomination for governor and went on to win the general election.

Republican primary

Candidates
 Jeff DeWit, businessman.
 Hugh Hallman, former mayor of Tempe
 Randy Pullen, former Chairman of the Arizona Republican Party

Polling

Results

Democratic primary

Candidates
 Gerard Davis (write-in)

Results

General election

Results

Superintendent of Public Instruction
Incumbent Republican Superintendent of Public Instruction John Huppenthal ran for re-election to a second term in office. Huppenthal faced down calls for him to resign or withdraw from the race after it was revealed that he made pseudonymous blog posts that attacked welfare recipients, Planned Parenthood and Spanish-language media.

Republican primary

Candidates

Polling

Results

Democratic primary

Candidates

Results

General election

Polling

Results

Mine Inspector
Incumbent Republican Mine Inspector Joe Hart is running for re-election to a third term in office. He was unopposed in the Republican primary and will be unopposed in the general election.

Republican primary

Democratic primary

General election

Corporation Commission
Two of the seats on the Arizona Corporation Commission are up for election. Republican Brenda Burns chose not to run for re-election to a second term in office and Republican Gary Pierce was term-limited and ineligible to run for re-election to a third term in office.

Republican primary

Polling

Results

Democratic primary

Results

General election

Polling

Results

References

 
Arizona